John Hagy Davis (June 14, 1929 – January 29, 2012) was an American author who wrote several books on the Bouvier and Kennedy families and on the Mafia, both the Sicilian Mafia and its Italian-American offshoot.

Biography
Davis was the son of stockbroker John Ethelbert Davis and Maude Reppelin Bouvier, younger sister of John Vernou Bouvier III and, therefore, first cousin of Jacqueline Kennedy Onassis and Lee Radziwill.  His mother and John V. Bouvier III were both children of prominent New York lawyer John Vernou Bouvier Jr.

Davis was a 1951 graduate of Princeton University as well as Columbia University. While serving in the United States Navy during the 1950s, he was officer with the Sixth Fleet stationed in Naples, Italy. Davis said that he was required to "deal with the mafia hoods who controlled the ports" as part of his duties as shore patrol and legal officer. He stated that during his time there he became interested in the history of Italy and studied the history of the mafia. After the Navy, Davis studied at the Italian Institute for Historical Studies in Naples, and directed a cultural center in southern Italy.

Author
Davis is the author of several books about American families such as the Bouviers, the Guggenheims and the Kennedys.

Mafia Kingfish
In 1989, the New American Library published Mafia Kingfish: Carlos Marcello and the Assassination of John F. Kennedy in which Davis implicated the mafia and Carlos Marcello in the assassination of John F. Kennedy. According to Davis Lee Harvey Oswald and Jack Ruby had "strong ties" to Marcello, and that an Oswald imposter visited the Russian embassies in Cuba and Mexico.

Publishers Weekly called it an "engrossing, startlingly detailed biography of a Mafia don". Kirkus Reviews said "the centerpiece of [Mafia Kingfish] is a plausible, even persuasive, case for the proposition that the Gulf Coast godfather masterminded the assassination of JFK." A reviewer for The Pittsburgh Press wrote: "'Mafia Kingfish' is such a page-turner, it could be a fictional thriller. But it's an amazing bit of contemporary history begging for someone to solve its mystery."

Mafia Dynasty
HarperCollins published Davis's 1993 book Mafia Dynasty: The Rise and Fall of the Gambino Crime Family. According to Publishers Weekly, the book "explores the history of the Cosa Nostra from its roots in Italy and brilliantly depicts the violent, vicious, vulgar brotherhood." Kirkus wrote that the book was "[a]n authoritative overview of the nation's premier criminal organization, and of the greed and hubris that have toppled its leaders time and again."

Later life and death
Davis died at his home in Manhattan in 2012 due to complications of Alzheimer's disease. He was buried in Woodlawn Cemetery in The Bronx.

Published works
 (1969) The Bouviers: Portrait of an American Family
 (1989) Mafia Kingfish: Carlos Marcello and the Assassination of John F. Kennedy
 (1993) Kennedy Contract: The Mafia Plot to Assassinate the President
 (1984) The Kennedys: Dynasty and Disaster
 (1978) The Guggenheims: An American Epic
 (1993) The Bouviers: From Waterloo to the Kennedys and Beyond
 (1994) Mafia Dynasty: The Rise and Fall of the Gambino Family
 (1998) Jacqueline Bouvier: An Intimate Memoir

References

External links

1929 births
2012 deaths
20th-century American male writers
20th-century American military personnel
20th-century American non-fiction writers
Bouvier family
Columbia University alumni
Deaths from Alzheimer's disease
Military personnel from New York City
Non-fiction writers about organized crime in the United States
Princeton University alumni
Researchers of the assassination of John F. Kennedy
United States Navy officers
Writers from Manhattan
Deaths from dementia in New York (state)